Omphalotrigonotis is a genus of flowering plants belonging to the family Boraginaceae.

Its native range is Southeastern China.

Species:

Omphalotrigonotis cupulifera 
Omphalotrigonotis vaginata

References

Boraginoideae
Boraginaceae genera